Whitworth Community High School is a secondary school in the village of Whitworth, Rossendale, Lancashire. It is currently designated as "Good" by Ofsted in all categories.

School ethos
Whitworth Community High School is a smaller high school with around 630 students on role. In their 2014 inspection report the Ofsted team found, "‘This is a school that values individuals, recognising that everyone is different but equal"

Academic achievement
In 2017 73% of students achieved the new headline measure of at least the new GCSE grade 4 in both English and Maths, making Whitworth Community High School the most improved school in Lancashire on this measure.

Inspection results
Whitworth Community High School is designated as ‘Good’ in all categories by Ofsted, following an inspection in December 2014.

Safeguarding was described as ‘exemplary’ by an Ofsted HMI team in December 2015.

School leadership and staffing
Since 2013/14 the head of Whitworth Community High School has been Gillian Middlemas.

The senior leadership team comprises the head, a deputy, 4 assistant heads and the School Business Manager.

External links
 Whitworth Community High School Web Site wchs.co

References

Schools in the Borough of Rossendale
Secondary schools in Lancashire
Community schools in Lancashire